Lincoln Christ's Hospital School is an English state secondary school with academy status located in Wragby Road in Lincoln. It was established in 1974, taking over the pupils and many of the staff of the older Lincoln Grammar School and Christ's Hospital Girls' High School (established in 1893), and two 20th-century secondary modern schools, St Giles's and Myle Cross.

History
Hospital schools date from the 13th century as boys' schools for parents who could not afford to pay school fees. They were also known as charity schools. The former Lincoln School may have dated from the 11th century, but it was re-founded as a charity school in the 17th century.

The endowment for Christ's Hospital Girls' School was derived from the former Bluecoat School on Christ's Hospital Terrace, Lincoln which was closed in 1883. This school was originally established in 1614 in St. Mary's Guildhall, Lincoln before it was moved to Christ Hospital Terrace in 1623. In September 1893 Lincoln Christ's Hospital Girls' High School was started, with Agnes Body as its headmistress.

Grammar schools
LCHS was formed from the merger of two single-sex grammar schools, both of which had some boarders. From 1906 the boys' school, Lincoln School (probably dating back to 1090), also known as Lincoln Grammar School, occupied a site on Wragby Road. The girls' school, Christ's Hospital Girls' High School, was founded in 1893 and was based at Greestone Place on Lindum Hill.

During the First World War, the building was requisitioned by the War Office to create the 4th Northern General Hospital, a facility for the Royal Army Medical Corps to treat military casualties.

Lincoln Cathedral choristers were educated at the school until the mid-20th century; the Cathedral School for Boys, now known as Lincoln Minster School, subsequently took over that role.

On 22 July 1941 an RAF Handley Page Hampden crashed into the boarding house of the Girls' High School on Greestone Stairs, killing Miss Edith Catherine Fowle, a languages teacher, as well as the occupants of the aircraft.

Comprehensive
In September 1974 the City of Lincoln was the only part of the county in which Lincolnshire County Council decided to abolish selective education. As a result, the city's two grammar schools merged with two secondary modern schools founded in 1933, St Giles's Secondary Modern School for Boys on Swift Gardens and Myle Cross Secondary Modern School for Girls on Addison Drive, to become a new comprehensive school. The buildings of St Giles's are now a temporary primary school, and those of Myle Cross are the Chad Varah Primary School.

The present-day school has had Language College status since 2001, and offers lessons in French, Spanish, German, Mandarin Chinese, Russian and most recently Latin.

Academy
Lincoln Christ's Hospital School became an academy in September 2011. It is now independent of local authority control, and funded directly from central government. However, the school continues to coordinate its admissions with Lincolnshire County Council.

Heads of Lincoln Grammar or Free School

At the Lincoln Greyfriars
1576 Mr Plumtre
1585  William Temple. Later secretary to Sir Philip Sidney and Provost of Trinity College, Dublin.
1593/4 Mr Nethercotes
1597  Mr Mason
1601-10 Robert Houghton
1616  John Phipps
1624-1652 Nathaniel Clarke
1656-1665  Mr Umfrevile
1681 Mr Bromsgrove
1683 Mr France
1663 Mr Gibson
1704-1724 Rev Samuel Garmston
1724 -1742 Mr  John Goodall
1752- ? Rev. Mr Rolt
1765-91 Re. John Hewthwaite
1792-1821 Rev John Carter
1828-50 Rev James Adcock
1852–1857: Revd George Foster Simpson, previously the first Rector of the High School of Montreal
1857-1875. Rev. John Fowler.

Greyfriars and Upper Lindum Terrace
1857–1875: Revd John Fowler.
1875-?1883 Rev A Babington. Headmaster of the Classical School  
1875-1897 Rev Robert Markham. Headmaster of the Middle School in the Greyfriars 
1883-1897 William Weekes Fowler. Headmaster of the Lincoln Classical School on Upper Lindum Terrace. 
1898 -?1906 F H Chambers. Head master of  Lincoln Grammar School on Upper Lindum Terrace.

Wragby Road
1911–1929: Reginald Moxon
1929–1937: Charles Edgar Young
1937–1957: George Franklin
1958–1962: Patrick Martin (later headmaster of Warwick School, 1962–77)
1962–1973: John Collins Faull (later headmaster of Tewkesbury School, 1972–?)
1973–1974: Arthur Behenna

Heads of Lincoln Christ's Hospital School
1974–1985: Arthur Behenna
1985–2004: David Cox
2005–2014: Andy Wright
2014–present: Martin Mckeown

Curriculum
Academic subjects studied include: English, Maths, Double and Triple Award Sciences, BTEC Science, Forensic and Medical Sciences,* Media, Modern Languages, Latin, History, Geography, RE, Psychology,* Sociology,* Philosophy and Ethics,* and Citizenship.

Vocational subjects studied include Fine Art, Art Textiles, BTEC Art, Music, Design & Technology, Drama, Drama & Theatre Studies,* Law,* ICT & Business Studies, Resistant Materials, Child Care, Electronics, Product Design,* Production Arts BTEC,* Performance Arts BTE,* Graphic Design, Photography and Engineering.*

(*) 6th form only subject.

Academic performance
When a grammar school, LCHS would have been the best performing school in Lincoln. As a comprehensive, its results place it in the top five most improved language colleges nationally. It gets GCSE results slightly above average, but A level results below average.

Admissions
Pupil population is just under 1,400, including over 300 in the sixth form. Of the school roll, 15 per cent receive free school meals.

Notable former pupils
Allison Pearson (born 1960), novelist and newspaper columnist
Marlon Beresford (born 1969), professional footballer with Middlesbrough F.C., Burnley F.C. and Luton Town F.C.: 1982–86
Paul Palmer, Olympic silver medal-winning swimmer at Atlanta: c. 1986

Lincoln Grammar School

Colonel John Hutchinson (1615–1664) Parliamentarian leader
Sir Francis Thornhagh (1617–1648), Parliamentarian soldier and MP: c. 1628–33
John Disney (1677–1730), churchman, and great-grandfather of John Disney the archaeologist: c. 1689–94
Peniston Booth, FRS (1681 – 1765), Dean of Windsor.
Thomas Pownall, Governor of Massachusetts in 1757–60: c. 1733–38
John Sibthorp, botanist: c. 1770–75
Henry Digby Beste, Christian scholar: 1776–84
Richard Watson, Methodist minister: c. 1792–97
John Taylor (English publisher): c. 1792–94
Henry Whitehead Moss, scholar: c. 1852–54
Evelyn Abbott, Greek scholar: c. 1854–59
George Francis Carline (1855–1920), RBA artist: 1866–73
William Henry Battle, surgeon, known for Battle's sign: c. 1866–70
James Ward Usher (1845–1921), art jeweller and philanthropist
William Logsdail, artist: c. 1870–75
Robert Humphreys OBE, director of Institute of Latin American Studies, 1965–74, and President of the Royal Historical Society, 1964–68: 1908–15
Basil Boothroyd, humorous writer with Punch: c. 1921–26
Alex Henshaw, Spitfire chief test pilot: 1922–27
Flt Lt Edward Johnson DFC, bomb aimer of AJ-N Lancaster of the Dambuster 617 Sqn squadron, who destroyed the Eder Dam: 1923–30
Noel Duckworth, coxed the 1934–36 Cambridge crews to victory in the Boat Race, and the 1936 Berlin Olympics GB Eight: 1924–31
David Cartwright, Bishop of Southampton, 1984–89: 1931–38
Steve Race (1921–2009), Home Service/Radio 4 presenter of My Music: 1932–39
Sir Neville Marriner (1924–2016) CH CBE, conductor: 1935–42
Dr Dennis Townhill (1925–2008) OBE, organist: 1936–43
Keith Fordyce, Light Programme/Radio 2 disc jockey and first presenter of Ready Steady Go!: 1940–47
David Robinson, arts journalist for The Times: 1941–48
Michael Marshall (born 1936), Bishop of Woolwich 1975–84: 1947–54
Colin Semper (born 1938), head of Religious Programmes 1966–69 at BBC Radio: 1949–57
Sir David Blatherwick OBE (born 1941), UK Ambassador to Ireland and Egypt: 1952–59
Derek Fatchett (1945–1999), Labour MP 1983–99 for Leeds Central: 1956–63
Peter Day (born 1947), Home Service/Radio 4 presenter of In Business: 1958–65
Mark Byford (born 1958), BBC deputy director-general: 1969–76
John Hurt (1940-2017), actor: c. 1952–57 (boarder)

Christ's Hospital Girls' High School
Bridget Cracroft-Eley (née Clifton-Brown), Lord Lieutenant of Lincolnshire 1995–2008: 1940s
Nancy Durrell (née Myers), first wife of Lawrence Durrell, and mother of Joanna Hines, the author and Guardian crime fiction reviewer
Mary Mackie (née Whitlam), novelist and non-fiction writer: 1953–58

Sister school
: Hebei Tangshan Foreign Language School

References

External links
Official website
Old Lincolnians Cricket Club
EduBase
EduBase for voluntary aided school

Secondary schools in Lincolnshire
Schools in Lincoln, England
1090s establishments in England
Bluecoat schools
Educational institutions established in the 11th century
Academies in Lincolnshire
People educated at Lincoln Grammar School